The Tahe oil field is an oil field located in Xinjiang. It was discovered in 1990 and developed by China National Petroleum Corporation. It began production in 1990 and produces oil.

The Tahe oil field is a part of the Akekule Arch which is located in the North Uplift of the Tarim Basin. This area experienced two events of karstification which affected the Ordovician strata. The paleokarst reservoirs constituting the Tahe oil field were mostly formed by the younger, early Hercynian karstification. The oil field contains multiple caves filled with sediments, collapse breccias, and chemical fills. Sediments and collapsed breccias are characteristic for the reservoir run-off zone, whereas vadose zone is characterized by high-angle fractures and epikarst zone is characterized by weathering residues and dissolution fractures. The paleogeomorphological results indicate that paleokarst structures formed mostly in highlands and slopes during the Hercynian karstification event.

References

Oil fields in China